Campillo may refer to:

Places in Spain
Campillo de Altobuey, a municipality in Cuenca, Castile-La Mancha
Campillo de Aragón, a municipality located in the province of Zaragoza, Aragon
Campillo de Aranda, a municipality located in the province of Burgos, Castile and León
Campillo de Arenas, a city located in the province of Jaén
Campillo de Azaba, a village and municipality in the province of Salamanca, Castile-León
Campillo de Deleitosa, a municipality located in the province of Cáceres, Extremadura
Campillo de Dueñas, a municipality located in the province of Guadalajara, Castile-La Mancha
Campillo de Llerena, a municipality located in the province of Badajoz, Extremadura
Campillo de Ranas, a municipality located in the province of Guadalajara, Castile-La Mancha

Other
Campillo (surname)
El Campillo (disambiguation), the name of several places
Campillos, a town and municipality in the province of Málaga, part of the autonomous community of Andalusia in southern Spain